Scott Cummings (born 3 December 1996) is a Scotland international rugby union player who plays for Glasgow Warriors at the Lock position.

Rugby Union career

Amateur career

Cummings first played his rugby for Kelvinside Academy but moved on to the BT Premiership side Glasgow Hawks. He was confirmed as part of SportScotland's academy system in 2013. 
Cummings has been drafted to Currie in the Scottish Premiership for the 2017-18 season.

Professional career

Cummings secured an Elite Development Programme and was aligned to Glasgow Warriors for the 2014–15 season. This meant he could continue playing for Glasgow Hawks whilst training and challenging for a place at the Warriors.

The lock made his debut for Glasgow Warriors in a pre-season friendly against ASM Clermont Auvergne. He went on to make his competitive debut against the Scarlets on 5 September 2015, and scored his first try the following week in a narrow victory against Connacht.

Cummings graduated from the Scottish Rugby Academy and signed a professional contract with Glasgow Warriors on 23 March 2016.

International career

Cummings was to be capped by Scotland for the under-16s, under-19s and the under-20s. He was in the 2015 Scotland Under-20 World Cup squad. Cummings received his first call up to the senior Scotland squad by coach Gregor Townsend in October 2017 for the Autumn Internationals.

Cummings received his first full senior cap from the bench for Scotland in the World Cup warm-up match against France on 17 August 2019.

He was capped by Scotland 'A' on 25 June 2022 in their match against Chile.

References

External links

1996 births
Living people
Rugby union players from Glasgow
Glasgow Warriors players
Scottish rugby union players
Glasgow Hawks players
Currie RFC players
Scotland international rugby union players
Rugby union locks